Étienne Loco Gbodolle (born 15 May 1954) is a Beninese boxer. He competed in the men's middleweight event at the 1980 Summer Olympics. At the 1980 Summer Olympics, he lost to Christer Corpi of Sweden.

References

External links
 

1954 births
Living people
Beninese male boxers
Olympic boxers of Benin
Boxers at the 1980 Summer Olympics
Place of birth missing (living people)
Middleweight boxers